Turzany may refer to the following places in Poland:
Turzany, Lower Silesian Voivodeship (south-west Poland)
Turzany, Kuyavian-Pomeranian Voivodeship (north-central Poland)